{
  "type": "FeatureCollection",
  "features": []
}
Church Street is a busy street in the Central Business District of Bangalore, India. It is a 750-metre stretch from Brigade Road to St. Mark's Road, running parallel to M G Road. The street is named for St. Mark's Cathedral to which it leads.

A tourist hotspot, Church Street is a major shopping and nightlife area. It is also a popular New Year's Eve celebration centre. 

In 2017, redevelopment work began on Church Street at a cost of 9 crore, which made it the first street in the city to be paved from granite cobblestones. The cobblestones were laid in a Kasuti pattern to reflect Karnataka's cultural heritage. 

In 2020, Church Street ran a pilot project called Clean Air Street during which the street was converted into a pedestrian zone with a complete ban on automobile traffic.

See also
 2014 Bangalore bombing – an IED blast on Church Street that caused one death and injuries to four others. The attack was suspected to have been carried out by the terrorist organisation Indian Mujahideen.

References

Roads in Bangalore
Tourist attractions in Bangalore